Utricularia tenuissima is a small, annual, terrestrial carnivorous plant that belongs to the genus Utricularia and is the only member of Utricularia sect. Martinia. U. tenuissima is endemic to South America, where it can be found in Brazil, Colombia, Guyana, Suriname, Trinidad, and Venezuela. It was originally published and described by Thomas Gaskell Tutin in 1934 and placed in its own section, Martinia, in 1986 by Peter Taylor.

See also 
 List of Utricularia species

References 

Carnivorous plants of South America
Flora of Brazil
Flora of Colombia
Flora of Guyana
Flora of Suriname
Flora of Trinidad and Tobago
Flora of Venezuela
tenuissima